Kenneth Graham Bevan (27 September 1898 – 3 December 1993) was an Anglican missionary bishop in China.

Early life
Bevan was born in 1898, in Hampstead, where his father was a curate. He was the son of the Rev. James Alfred Bevan, who had captained Wales in their first international rugby union match, and his wife Annie. He was educated at Great Yarmouth Grammar School and the London College of Divinity.

Career
He was ordained deacon in 1923, and priest in 1924, and was then a curate at Holy Trinity, Tunbridge Wells (now Trinity Theatre)  before missionary service with the Anglican-Episcopal Province of China from 1925. Consecrated a bishop in 1940 in Holy Trinity Cathedral, Shanghai, for 10 years he was Bishop of Eastern Szechwan. The obituary in the Church Times stated that: "His diocese was wild and mountainous, and in travelling round it he was reduced, he said, to carrying only a Bible and a toothbrush."

Following the end of the Chinese Civil War and the Communist takeover of China, Bevan returned to England and became the vicar of Woolhope (1951-1966)), during which time he was also rural dean of Hereford (1955-1966) and Prebendary de Moreton et Whaddon at Hereford Cathedral (1956-1966). On retirement in 1966 he became Master of Archbishop Holgate's Hospital in Hemsworth and then an assistant bishop in the Diocese of Wakefield for a further 11 years. During that time, he founded the Retired Clergy Association.

Personal life
Bevan married Jocelyn Duncan (known as Joyce) Barber in 1927 in Shanghai Cathedral. They had three daughters.

He died in 1993, aged 95.

See also 
 Anglicanism in Sichuan

References

1898 births
1993 deaths
People educated at Great Yarmouth Grammar School
Anglican missionaries in Sichuan
Anglican missionary bishops in China
20th-century Anglican bishops in China
Alumni of St John's College, Nottingham
Diocese of Szechwan
Anglican bishops of East Szechwan